The 2022 season was the Birmingham Phoenix's second season of the 100 ball franchise cricket, The Hundred. The season was positive overall for the franchise as both teams performed well, each missing out on progressing to the knockout stages due to their net run rate scores.

Players

Men's side 
 Bold denotes players with international caps.

Women's side 
 Bold denotes players with international caps.

Group fixtures

Fixtures (men)

Fixtures (Women)
Due to the shortened women's competition, Birmingham Phoenix didn't play against Southern Brave
.

Standings

Women

 advances to Final
 advances to the Eliminator

Men

 advances to Final
 advances to the Eliminator

References

The Hundred (cricket)
2022 in English cricket